Yesenia Nolasco Ramírez (Tehuantepec, Oaxaca; August 22, 1982), Graduated in Law and Mexican politics, member of the National Regeneration Movement party (Morena), Deputy elected of the Congress of the Union for the district XIX of the state of Oaxaca. She was municipal president of Tehuantepec from 2017-2018.

References

1982 births
Living people
Politicians from Oaxaca
Women members of the Chamber of Deputies (Mexico)
Members of the Chamber of Deputies (Mexico)
21st-century Mexican politicians
21st-century Mexican women politicians
Municipal presidents in Oaxaca
Deputies of the LXII Legislature of Mexico